Veronica Cochela-Cogeanu (born 15 November 1965) is a retired Romanian rower. She competed in different events at the 1988, 1992, 1996 and 2000 Olympics and won two gold, three silver and one bronze medals. Since the 1989 World Rowing Championships, she has competed under her married name. After retiring from competition she worked as a rowing coach, and since 2015 trains the national team.

References

External links
 
 
 
 
 
 

1965 births
Living people
Romanian female rowers
Rowers at the 1988 Summer Olympics
Rowers at the 1992 Summer Olympics
Rowers at the 1996 Summer Olympics
Rowers at the 2000 Summer Olympics
Olympic rowers of Romania
Olympic silver medalists for Romania
Olympic bronze medalists for Romania
Olympic gold medalists for Romania
Olympic medalists in rowing
World Rowing Championships medalists for Romania
Medalists at the 2000 Summer Olympics
Medalists at the 1996 Summer Olympics
Medalists at the 1992 Summer Olympics
Medalists at the 1988 Summer Olympics